Manek Premchand is an Indian writer and historian of film music at St. Xavier's College, Mumbai, who has written several books pertaining to the history of Indian film music and biographies of musicians. He has hosted shows on WorldSpace Satellite Radio and been a consultant with Saregama.

In 2003 he completed his first book, Yesterday’s Melodies, Today’s Memories, with the aim of giving songwriters, singers and composers credit.  It was followed by Musical Moments from Hindi Films (2006). In 2010 he became part of the Mohammed Rafi Academy's governing body and two years later produced Romancing the Song (2012). He contributed an essay on Shivkumar Sharma in Shiv Kumar Sharma: The Man and His Music (2014), and released a biography of Talat Mahmood the following year. In Hitting the Right Notes (2016) he focusses on songwriters and composers, the difference the music made and the trends they produced. He devoted a chapter to Mubarak Begum in The Hindi Music Jukebox: Exploring Unforgettable Songs (2018), and has published a biography of Hemant Kumar in 2020.

Early life and education
Manek Premchand spent his early childhood in Delhi as the youngest of six children. He was introduced to music by his mother who used to sing. By the age of ten, he had moved to Mumbai, where he became acquainted with the nearby qawwali singer Jaani Babu Qawwal, who arranged for him to learn the bulbul tarang. His education has included a diploma in journalism and an arts degree from the University of Mumbai. He received a two-year Senior Fellowship from the Ministry of Culture on the subject The Changing Face of Lyrics in Hindi Cinema. Prior to his career in writing he spent many years abroad.
He is married to Lata Jagtiani, a writer and author of several books including Sindhi Reflections and Bhagavad Gita in 365 Days.

Career

Premchand has hosted shows on WorldSpace Satellite Radio and been a consultant with Saregama, for whom he has compiled CDs. He is an adviser to Manipal University Press. Manipal Film Festival (April 2013), organised by Communication Management Students of Manipal Institute of Communication (MIC) to celebrate 100 Years of Cinema, invited him as a speaker and honored him at the event. For students at Manipal University, he has lectured on several subjects, especially on The Evolution of Music in Hindi Cinema. He hosted a commemoration of 100 Years of Cinema arranged by Bhavans Kala Kendra, Mumbai. He did a video presentation as a salute to the city of Bombay (now Mumbai) for The Asiatic Society of Mumbai.  Among the film and music related events he has anchored was an event to honor stars of yesteryear Shammi Kapoor, Waheeda Rehman and Vyjayanthimala, reported in The Financial Express. He has hosted an evening to celebrate yesteryear’s playback singer Sudha Malhotra. He conceptualized and anchored a show at the birth centenary of lyricist and poet Sahir Ludhianvi in March 2021. He has conversed with composer Anandji and singer Usha Timothy on The Indian Performing Rights Society (IPRS) platform, a non-profit organization of authors, composers and music publishers.

He was the Guest of Honor to celebrate the music of composers Laxmikant-Pyarelal. He has been invited as a guest on television shows related to music personalities from Hindi cinema like Shankar-Jaikishan, Talat Mahmood, Jan Nisar Akhtar, Kishore Kumar, Mohammed Rafi among them. Even television shows on different themes like Bollywood's Top 20 Rain Songs. He has been a guest speaker at several Rotary Club meets, outlining the changing trends in music over the past about 90 years. He has arranged several interactive audiovisual presentations for Asiatic Society of Mumbai, including one on Mohammad Rafi, on the singer’s death anniversary on 31 July 2021 and on actor-filmmaker Dev Anand, on 12 February 2022. He was interviewed by the BBC after the passing away of santoor maestro Pt Shiv Kumar Sharma. Earlier, Premchand’s contribution to the santoor exponent’s biography was termed "fascinating" by The Free Press Journal. 

He served as a Jury Member for the Bengaluru Film Festival in March 2022,  and was presented a momento by the Governor of Karnataka for the same.

Manek Premchand teaches broadcasting to post-graduate students at Xavier Institute of Communications, a part of St. Xavier's College, Mumbai, where he is a historian of film music. For his Mass Communications students, in July 2022, he conducted a field trip showing where the first cinema was shown in India, as also from where the first radio signals were sent.  In October 2022, Premchand was felicitated for his work in writing on Hindi cinema by FLO, the ladies wing of FICCI (Federation of Indian Chamber of Commerce and Industry).

In January 2023, he presented an audiovisual of songs based on the streets of Mumbai in a program called "Zara Hatke Zara Bachke" for the Asiatic Society of Mumbai.  He presented a Masterclass at the Paridrishya Short Film festival in Bengaluru in February 2023: In February 2023 he also curated a film music event on the theme of Unity in Diversity sponsored by Infosys Foundation and hosted by Bhavans Kala Kendra.

Writing

Among the publications he wrote for were Hindustan Times, Mumbai Mirror, and Deccan Herald. He had a weekly column with DNA Jaipur to which he contributed film and music related articles. Among his essays is one about the contribution of Parsis in Hindi cinema, and an article on Dilip Kumar with a focus on his musical prowess and abilities for The Indian Performing Right Society Limited (IPRS).

Premchand began writing his first book, Yesterday’s Melodies, Today’s Memories, in January 1997, with the aim of giving songwriters, lyricists and singers of what he calls "the golden era of Hindi film music", credit. It took almost seven years to complete and was released in 2003. In his research he interviewed several people including singer Manna Dey, poet Majrooh and lyricist and composer Prem Dhawan. He estimated that 4,334 Hindi films made between 1930 and 1970 depicted around 36,000 songs. The book was described as having "excellent short sketches of the major composers, singers, lyricists, and arrangers" in Global Bollywood: Travels of Hindi Song and Dance.  In 2018, the book saw its third reprint with enhanced content. While Gregory D Booth, the author of Behind the Curtain: Making Music in Mumbai's Film Studios (Oxford University Press, 2009), mentions Premchand's book several times in his own book, it has also been cited as a reference point for Booth's book. It was followed by Musical Moments from Hindi Films (2006), released by Hema Malini.

In 2010 Mohammed Rafi's son Shahid Rafi launched the Mohammed Rafi Academy with Premchand as part of the academy's governing body. Two years later Premchand produced Romancing the Song (2012), a large book that plots the journey of lyrics over 80 years of cinema, in which he clarifies who really was the male voice in Kismet's "Dheere dheere aa". He wrote a third of the 2014 book Shiv Kumar Sharma: The Man and His Music, a biography of Shivkumar Sharma, alongside a piece by Pandit Vijay Kichlu.

Premchand has been credited by Andrew James Pettit for help during the latter's doctoral thesis in Ethnomusicology, completed at the University of California, Los Angeles, in 2014.

In 2015, he released a biography of Talat Mahmood, published by Manipal University. It contains chapters written by Mahmood's daughter Sabina Talat Mahmood Rana, and son Khalid Talat Mahmood. Mahmood was a favourite of his and his mother and he stated in an interview that "my book on him was a way of saying 'Thanks Talatji, for the hundreds of hours you gave me joy...and sometimes tears'." The following year he produced Hitting the Right Notes (2016), which reveals who blew the whistle in Kati Patang'''s "Ye shaam mastani". The book focusses on songwriters and composers, the difference the music made and the trends they produced.

His 2018 The Hindi Music Jukebox: Exploring Unforgettable Songs devotes one chapter to Mubarak Begum. In 2020, he released the biography of Hemant Kumar in a book titled The Unforgettable Music of Hemant Kumar. Gulzar has written the Foreword for two of Manek Premchand’s books – Romancing the Song (2012) and The Unforgettable Music of Hemant Kumar (2020). In his foreword to Premchand's book Romancing the Song, Dadasaheb Phalke award winner, filmmaker-lyricist Gulzar has compared the work with Jawaharlal Nehru's The Discovery of India. For his book The Unforgettable Music of Hemant Kumar, santoor maestro Padma Vibhushan awardee Pt Shiv Kumar Sharma has called Manek Premchand the Munshi Premchand of Hindi cinema.

His book Majrooh Sultanpuri: The Poet for all Reasons on the work of the Hindi film lyricist and poet, was published in December 2021. When asked why the word Reasons instead of the generally used Seasons, the author said, "While there are only 4 seasons, there can be far many more reasons. A poet for happiness and misery, but also for hope and despair, spirituality and love, dignity and doom, the whole range of human emotions. Majrooh offers us nuances of all these and more. I felt Reasons was more apt here." The book offers clarity on the often misunderstood poetic forms of the ghazal, rubai and nazm. "There are detailed chapters on ghazals and nazms (in both of which Premchand does an excellent job of explaining the technicalities around these two forms of Urdu poetry.)"  A review of the book: "...the meat of the book for those who love the world of words, is dissection, interpretation of the poetry, imagery, detailed description with reference to the scene of the film, for hundreds of songs in a number of chapters on different themes." Another review declares the book "a joy forever".

Released in January 2022, his latest book, Windows to the Soul: and other essays on Music, a collection of essays on music, tells us why the tambourine can't play sad music, presents singer Mukesh's fascination for Raag Darbari, explores the music-inspiring "popular charmer Marine Drive", and urges the I & B Ministry to posthumously confer the Bharat Ratna on composer Madan Mohan.

Publications

 Books Yesterday’s Melodies, Today’s Memories, (2003), including a guest article by MV Kamath and a foreword by Ameen SayaniMusical Moments from Hindi Films (2006), including Foreword by KhayyamRomancing the Song (2012), with a foreword by Gulzar, a Keynote by L K Advani, Curtain Raiser by Ameen Sayani and Last Word by Shivkumar SharmaShiv Kumar Sharma: The Man and His Music (2014). (Contributor)Talat Mahmood: The Velvet Voice (2015)Hitting the Right Notes: Hindi Cinema's Golden Music (2016)The Hindi Music Jukebox: Exploring Unforgettable Songs (2018)Yesterday's Melodies, Today's Memories (Revised Third Edition, 2018)The Unforgettable Music of Hemant Kumar (2020)Majrooh Sultanpuri, The Poet For All Reasons (2021)Windows to the Soul: and other essays on Music (2022) Articles 
 The Only Film Mahatma Gandhi Saw Songs of Life, Sweet And Sour Pt Shiv Kumar SharmaMeeting Dilip SaabThe other Kishore Kumar, surrounded by sadnessMemories of Another DayA Rare GreatnessThe World Did Not End on 21st December 2012Daan Singh: Forgotten Melody''

References 

Historians of South Asia
20th-century Indian historians
21st-century Indian historians
Living people
Year of birth missing (living people)
Indian film historians
Music historians
21st-century Indian biographers
University of Mumbai alumni